Eden is a British pay television channel broadcasting factual content in the United Kingdom and Ireland as part of the UKTV network of channels. The channel originally launched on 1 November 1997 and relaunched in its current format on 27 January 2009.

History
The UKTV channels were all rebranded on 1 November 1997. At the same time, Eden was launched as UK Horizons, showing factual documentaries, mainly from the BBC archives, on a variety of subjects if not covered by another channel in the UKTV network, such as Jacob Bronowski's The Ascent of Man. Much of this programming had come. 8th March 2004 UK Horizons closed UKTV Documentary.

On 9 October 2008, UKTV announced plans to rebrand UKTV Docemntary and UKTV people in early 2009. The news came just two days after UKTV's entertainment channels were rebranded to Watch, Gold and Alibi. They announced that UKTV Horizons would be rebranded as Eden and this rebrand took place on 26 January 2009. As part of the rebrand, the channels programming output changed from all documentaries to primarily documentaries focusing on the natural environment. All other documentaries were transferred to UKTV History or UKTV People, depending on their subject matter.

Subsidiary channels

Eden +1
From launch, the channel has had a timeshift service, called Eden +1 and UKTV Horizons +1 before it. The service ran on Sky and Virgin Media and broadcast the channels schedule one hour later than usual. The timeshift was removed from Virgin Media in October 2008 to allow bandwidth for new channel Watch, however the time shift service was restored on 7 October 2011.

Eden HD
Eden HD launched on 4 October 2010 on Sky channel 559, running a high-definition simulcast of the main channel. As part of Virgin Media's deal to sell its share of UKTV, all five of UKTV's HD channels were added to Virgin's cable television service by 2012. Eden HD was added to Virgin Media on 7 October 2011. On 3 October 2016, Eden HD was added to BT. On 2 October 2017, Eden HD was removed from the Sky lineup and replaced with Gold HD.

Programming

The programming used on the channel is mostly from the BBC archives, and are therefore edited to fit the time slot: an original broadcast for an hour-long programme on the BBC might be as much as 58 minutes long, while the same programme here might be 42 minutes long without the commercials. Eden is renowned for showing blue-chip natural history but has more recently moved into more scientific programmes while keeping the blue-chip, cinematic identity. Eden has also produced its own exclusive programming, with the most recent series David Attenborough's Natural Curiosities, produced by Humble Bee Films, broadcasting from January 2013.

See also
 UKTV
 Television in the United Kingdom

References

External links

UKTV at The TV Room

Television channels and stations established in 2004
UKTV
UKTV channels